George Owen Wynne Apperley (1884-1960) was a British painter. Described as “one of the finest” of the late Romantic artists, he worked mainly in Spain and in North Africa.

Life
Apperley was born at Ventnor, on the Isle of Wight, in 1884. He trained briefly at the Herkomer School in Bushey, Hertfordshire, but was mostly self-taught. He moved to Spain in 1917, abandoning his British wife, Hilda Pope, and family, and established himself in a carmen in the Albaicín district of Granada. He became friends with many of the artists resident in the city, but was forced to leave in 1932 when his conservative political stance regarding the Second Spanish Republic led to the bombing of his house. He moved with his second family, his muse and later wife, Enriqueta Contreras and their two sons, to Tangier, Morocco, where he died in 1960. He is commemorated in Granada by a statue, unveiled in 2011.

Works
Apperley first worked on Classical and mythological subjects. His moves to Spain, and subsequently Morocco, saw his focus shift to portraiture. Examples of his work are held by the Victoria & Albert Museum, the Museo de Málaga, the Lady Lever Art Gallery and the Bushey Museum.

Gallery

Notes

References

Sources
 
 
20th-century British painters
1884 births
1960 deaths